John Russell (1620-1687) was an English soldier and politician who sat in the House of Commons  from 1641 to 1644. He fought in the Royalist army in the English Civil War. 

Russell was the third son of Francis Russell, fourth Earl of Bedford, known as the "wise earl", and his wife Catherine Brydges,  daughter of Giles Brydges, 3rd Baron Chandos. He was a wealthy man with estates at Shingay, Cambridgeshire. 

In 1641, Russell was elected Member of Parliament for Tavistock in the Long Parliament after his brother William Lord Russell inherited the peerage.  Russell served in the King's army and was a member of the Sealed Knot. The family had divided loyalties in the Civil War. His father had been a  champion of the parliamentary cause and his brother changed sides twice. He had many aristocratic equally vacillating connections among his brothers-in-law: the Parliamentarians, Lord Brooke and Lord Grey of Wark, the turncoat Earl of Carlisle and the Royalists Lord Bristol and Lord Newport of High Ercall. Russell commanded Prince Rupert's blue coated regiment of foot, and was disabled from sitting in parliament in 1644. He was prominent at the storming of Leicester in May 1645, was wounded at Naseby and was in the Oxford garrison before its surrender. 

After the Restoration Russell was commissioned colonel and captain of John Russell's Regiment of Guards which became incorporated into the 1st Regiment of Foot Guards, or later the Grenadier Guards. He commanded the regiment until 1681. He enjoyed dress, dance, and music although his taste belonged to the fashion of an earlier generation.

References

Further reading
 Royalist Conspiracy in England 1649-1660, David Underdown, Yale University Press, 1960, pages 80 & 81.

1687 deaths
Cavaliers
English MPs 1640–1648
Younger sons of earls
Year of birth unknown
Grenadier Guards officers
Members of the Parliament of England for Tavistock